WYRU (1160 AM) is a 5,000-watt radio station broadcasting a gospel format, licensed to Red Springs, North Carolina.

History
In 1990, WYRU switched to a full-time gospel format with a mix of musical styles, after having played black gospel in the evenings.

Two years after Carolina Radio Group executive director Gene Hanrahan came to work there, WYRU was doing so well that a new FM station, WLRD, was added.

In 1997, Beasley Broadcasting purchased WYRU and WLRD from Lumbee Regional Development Association for about $1.2 million.

References

External links

YRU